Yulin University is a Chinese university. It is located in Yulin in Shaanxi Province, China.

Yulin University offers degrees in pipe engineering, linguistics, science, agriculture, law and other disciplines. Yulin University is a full-time system and comprehensive regular college.

History 

It converted from a college to a university in 2003. It was founded in 1958 as Suide Normal College.

Facilities 

The school covers an area of 640 thousand square meters (960 acres), with building area of 457 thousand square meters, teaching equipment worth 89,460 thousand yuan. The school hosts 958 faculty members and 14,869 full-time students, including 11,886 undergraduates, offering 46 undergraduate professional majors.

References

Universities and colleges in Shaanxi
1958 establishments in China
Educational institutions established in 1958